Litopterna (from  "smooth heel") is an extinct order of South American native ungulates.  Like other endemic South American mammals, their relationship to other mammal groups had long been unclear, but recent genetic and proteomic evidence indicates that their closest living relatives are Perissodactyls (odd-toed ungulates) including horses, rhinoceros, and tapirs, and that litopterns are closely related to notoungulates, another widespread group of South American ungulates. 

There were two major groups of litopterns: Proterotheriidae and Macraucheniidae. Proterotheriids were medium to large animals that evolved adaptations for fast running, and occupied a variety of niches that elsewhere were filled by animals such as goats and antelopes, mouse deer, and horses. Macraucheniids were large to very large animals with long necks; they evolved retracted nasal openings, indicating that a number of their species likely had a muscular upper lip or short trunk. They likely filled roles in the environment similar to camels, giraffes, sivatheres, and browsing rhinoceroses on other continents. Many types of litopterns were abundant in South American faunas, almost all ate plants, and the group reached its maximum diversity in the late Miocene. All litopterns displayed toe reduction – three-toed forms developed, and some proterotheriids had a single hoof on each foot.

Together with Macraucheniopsis, Neolicaphrium, and Xenorhinotherium, Macrauchenia was among the youngest genera of litopterns, and these two appear to have been the only members of the group to survive the Great American Biotic Interchange. All four became extinct at the end of the Pleistocene. The genera that died out during this faunal exchange are presumed to have been driven to extinction at least in part by competition with invading North American ungulates.

Evolutionary background 
This order is known only from fossils in South America and Antarctica, however, possible remains belonging to a litoptern, likely a macraucheniid, have been found in Mexico. Litopterns, like the notoungulates and pyrotheres, are examples of ungulate mammals that evolved independently in "splendid isolation" on the island continent of South America. Like Australia, South America was isolated from all other continents following the breakup of Gondwana. During this period of isolation, unique mammals evolved to fill ecological niches similar to other mammals elsewhere. The Litopterna occupied ecological roles as browsers and grazers similar to perissodactyl and artiodactyl hoofed mammals in Laurasia.

Litopterns were common and varied in early faunas and persisted, in decreasing variety, into the Pleistocene. Early forms were originally classified by European and North American paleontologists as closely related to condylarths, believed to be the order that gave rise to modern hoofed mammals. Litopterns were seen as persisting condylarths, primitive mammals that survived in isolation. "Condylarth" is now recognized as a wastebasket taxon for any generalized early mammal that wasn't obviously a predator, making this theory outdated. The modern version of the idea is that litopterns are a sister group of one of the ungulate taxa whose early fossils are found in Eurasia, meaning that all hoofed mammals share distant common ancestors. However, an opposing view has been that litopterns (together with other South-American ungulates) originated independently from ungulates on other continents, and thus are unrelated to all the groups once called condylarths, including the early perissodactyls and artiodactyls. In the independent-origin theory, litopterns are classified with other endemic South American ungulates as the clade Meridiungulata. 

Sequencing of mitochondrial DNA in 2017, extracted from a Macrauchenia patachonica fossil from a cave in southern Chile, indicates that Litopterna is the sister group to Perissodactyla, making litopterns true ungulates. The estimated divergence date is 66 million years ago. Analyses of collagen sequences obtained from Macrauchenia and the notoungulate Toxodon have led to the same conclusion, and add notoungulates to the sister group clade to litopterns. This idea contrasts with the results of some past morphological analyses which favoured them as afrotherians. It is consistent with some more recent morphological analyses which suggested they were basal ungulates. Panperissodactyla has been proposed as the name of an unranked clade to include perissodactyls and their extinct South American ungulate relatives.

Taxonomy 

 Order Litopterna
 Proacrodon
 Family Protolipternidae 
 Asmithwoodwardia
 Miguelsoria
 Protolipterna
 Family Indaleciidae
 Adiantoides
 Indalecia
 Family Sparnotheriodontidae
 Phoradiadius
 Notiolofos
 Sparnotheriodon
 Victorlemoinea
 Family Amilnedwardsiidae
 Amilnedwardsia
 Ernestohaeckelia
 Rutimeyeria
 Family Notonychopidae
 Notonychops
 Requisia
 Superfamily Macrauchenioidea
 Family Adianthidae
 Proectocion
 Adianthinae
 Adianthus
 Proadiantus
 Proheptaconus
 Thadanius
 Tricoelodus
 Family Macraucheniidae
 Llullataruca
 Subfamily Cramaucheniinae
 Coniopternium
 Caliphrium
 Cramauchenia
 Phoenixauchenia
 Polymorphis
 Pternoconius
 Theosodon
 Subfamily Macraucheniinae
 Cullinia
 Huayqueriana
 Macrauchenia
 Macraucheniopsis
 Oxyodontherium
 Paranauchenia
 Promacrauchenia
 Scalabrinitherium
 Windhausenia
 Xenorhinotherium
 Superfamily Proterotherioidea
 Family Proterotheriidae

References

Further reading

External links 

 An artist's rendition of a Macrauchenia, a representative genus of the Litopterna. Retrieved from the Red Académica Uruguaya megafauna page

 
Danian first appearances
Holocene extinctions
Fossil taxa described in 1889
Taxa named by Florentino Ameghino